Pirawa is a city and a municipality in Jhalawar district in the India.

Geography
It has an average elevation of 370 metres (1213 feet).

Demographics
 India census, Pirawa had a population of 11,182. Males constitute 51% of the population and females 49%. Pirawa has an average literacy rate of 66%, higher than the national average of 59.5%: male literacy is 74%, and female literacy is 58%. In Pirawa, 16% of the population is under 6 years of age.

Education
Vardhaman Be.d College, Guradiya, Pirawa 
Government College, pirawa, Rajasthan, India
 Government schools  
 Govt. Senior Secondary school
 Govt. Senior secondary girls school ( arts )
 Private schools 
 Adarsh vidhya mandir 
 Mahaveer digambar jain school
 Central public school 
 Maa bharti school 
 Jyoti senior secondary school

N.G.O.
Zeal Educational & Welfare Society
Secretary : Shahid Mohammad

Jain Aryan's Welfare And Education Society
President: Saurabh Jain
Secratry: Manohar Singh sisodiya

References

Cities and towns in Jhalawar district